Leiopleura is a genus of beetles in the family Buprestidae, containing the following species:

References

Buprestidae genera